The 1979 European Cup Winners' Cup Final was a football match contested between Barcelona of Spain and Fortuna Düsseldorf of West Germany. It was held at St. Jakob Stadium in Basel on 16 May 1979. The venue was decided in Bern by the UEFA Executive Committee on 27 September 1978. It was the final match of the 1978–79 European Cup Winners' Cup and the 19th European Cup Winners' Cup final. Barcelona won 4–3 (a.e.t.) after goals from Tente Sánchez, Juan Manuel Asensi, Carles Rexach, and Hans Krankl, conquering the first UEFA-sanctioned trophy in its history.

Route to the final

Match

Details

See also
1979 European Cup Final
1979 UEFA Cup Final
FC Barcelona in international football competitions

Footnotes

External links
UEFA Cup Winners' Cup results at Rec.Sport.Soccer Statistics Foundation
1979 European Cup Winners' Cup Final at UEFA.com

3
FC Barcelona matches
Fortuna Düsseldorf matches
1979
1979
1978–79 in Spanish football
1978–79 in German football
Sports competitions in Basel
May 1979 sports events in Europe
20th century in Basel